Airport is a census-designated place (CDP) in Stanislaus County, California. The 2010 United States census reported Airport's population was 1,964.

Geography
According to the United States Census Bureau, the CDP covers an area of 0.6 square miles (1.5 km), 98.21% of it land and 1.79% of it water.

Demographics

The 2010 United States Census reported that Airport had a population of 1,964. The racial makeup of Airport was 1,108 (56.4%) White, 41 (2.1%) African American, 47 (2.4%) Native American, 66 (3.4%) Asian, 3 (0.2%) Pacific Islander, 564 (28.7%) from other races, and 135 (6.9%) from two or more races. Hispanic or Latino of any race were 1,250 persons (63.6%).

The Census reported that 1,937 people (98.6% of the population) lived in households, 27 (1.4%) lived in non-institutionalized group quarters, and 0 (0%) were institutionalized.

There were 511 households, out of which 258 (50.5%) had children under the age of 18 living in them, 213 (41.7%) were opposite-sex married couples living together, 114 (22.3%) had a female householder with no husband present, 58 (11.4%) had a male householder with no wife present.  There were 76 (14.9%) unmarried opposite-sex partnerships, and 7 (1.4%) same-sex married couples or partnerships. 76 households (14.9%) were made up of individuals, and 15 (2.9%) had someone living alone who was 65 years of age or older. The average household size was 3.79.  There were 385 families (75.3% of all households); the average family size was 4.04.

The population was spread out, with 611 people (31.1%) under the age of 18, 231 people (11.8%) aged 18 to 24, 553 people (28.2%) aged 25 to 44, 448 people (22.8%) aged 45 to 64, and 121 people (6.2%) who were 65 years of age or older.  The median age was 29.7 years. For every 100 females, there were 105.0 males.  For every 100 females age 18 and over, there were 105.9 males.

The homeowner vacancy rate was 1.1%; the rental vacancy rate was 12.1%.  683 people (34.8% of the population) lived in owner-occupied housing units and 1,254 people (63.8%) lived in rental housing units.

References

Census-designated places in Stanislaus County, California
Census-designated places in California